Corriveau is a French surname, and may refer to:

André Corriveau (filmmaker), film editor and director from Quebec, Canada
André Corriveau (ice hockey) (1928–1993), retired Canadian professional ice hockey forward
François Corriveau (born 1969), politician in Quebec, Canada
Jacques Corriveau, Quebec businessperson and owner of the graphic design firm Pluri Design Canada Inc
John Dennis Corriveau, OFM Cap (born 1941), Canadian prelate of the Roman Catholic Church
Léopold Corriveau (born 1926), Liberal party member of the Canadian House of Commons
Marie-Josephte Corriveau (born 1733), Canadian murderer
Yvon Corriveau (born 1967), retired Canadian ice hockey left winger

French-language surnames